Elections to the Supreme Soviet of the Estonian SSR were held on 15 June 1975. The Bloc of Communists and Non-Party Candidates was the only party able to contest the elections, and won all 200 seats.

Results

See also
List of members of the Supreme Soviet of the Estonian Soviet Socialist Republic, 1975–1980

References

Estonia
Single-candidate elections
One-party elections
1975 in Estonia
June 1975 events in Europe
Parliamentary elections in Estonia
Estonian Soviet Socialist Republic
Election and referendum articles with incomplete results